Serhiy Fedorovich Tkach (September 15, 1952 – November 4, 2018), also known as Sergey Tkach, was a Ukrainian police officer and serial killer who was convicted for the killings of thirty-seven women and girls in the Soviet Union and Ukraine between 1980 to 2005.

Background
Serhiy Tkach was born on September 15, 1952 in Kiselyovsk, Kemerovo Oblast, Russian SFSR, Soviet Union. He served in the Soviet Army, and according to neighbours claimed to have been a veteran of the Soviet-Afghan War. Tkach worked as a police investigator in Kemerovo Oblast, where he was recommended for admission to a Ministry of Internal Affairs school until he was caught falsifying evidence and forced to resign. Afterwards Tkach worked numerous different jobs before moving to the Ukrainian SSR in 1982, where he began working again as a police investigator in Dnipropetrovsk Oblast.

Murders
In 1984, young women and girls began to noticeably disappear across Dnipropetrovsk Oblast, Kharkiv Oblast, Zaporizhzhia Oblast and Crimea in eastern Ukraine, near where Tkach lived and worked. He targeted female victims, aged between 8 and 18, who were raped, suffocated, and after death were sexually defiled. Tkach used his knowledge of criminal investigation procedure to mislead other policemen investigating his killings, such as choosing victims near railway lines recently treated with tar to throw police dogs off his scent.

Arrest, conviction, and imprisonment
In August 2005, Tkach attended the funeral of one of his victims. Children also in attendance claimed to have seen him with the victim shortly before her death. He was arrested at his home in Polohy and admitted to his crimes, claiming to have killed over 100 people until his arrest, and demanded the death penalty. In 2008, after a yearlong trial, Tkach was sentenced to life imprisonment for the murder of thirty-seven women and girls over more than two decades. 

Over the years, fifteen men had been wrongly jailed for some of the murders of which Tkach was found guilty, one of whom committed suicide, and another was not released until March 2012.

A 2018 Netflix documentary titled Inside the World's Toughest Prisons revealed that Tkach fathered a child while in prison with a woman in her twenties who became infatuated with him after reading an interview in the media. She went on to marry Tkach in 2015, who was allowed conjugal visits according to human rights provisions.

Death
Tkach died in Prison No. 8 of Zhytomyr, Zhytomyr Oblast, where he served his sentence, on November 4, 2018. The cause of death was heart failure. Tkach was buried on November 7 by the prison staff as none of his relatives had claimed the body.

See also
List of serial killers by country
List of serial killers by number of victims

References

1952 births
2018 deaths
Ukrainian people convicted of murder
Ukrainian police officers convicted of murder
Ukrainian prisoners sentenced to life imprisonment
Ukrainian serial killers
Male serial killers
Necrophiles
People convicted of murder by Ukraine
Prisoners sentenced to life imprisonment by Ukraine
Prisoners who died in Ukrainian detention
Serial killers who died in prison custody
Serial killers who worked in law enforcement
Soviet rapists
Soviet serial killers
Ukrainian rapists
Violence against women in Ukraine